Alexander Panteleon Salvado (19 October 1890 – 20 May 1954) was an Australian rules footballer who played for the Richmond Football Club and Melbourne Football Club in the Victorian Football League (VFL).

Notes

External links 
		
 
Demonwiki profile

1890 births
1954 deaths
Australian rules footballers from Victoria (Australia)
Richmond Football Club players
Melbourne Football Club players
Northcote Football Club players